Philia was a town of ancient Thrace, on the coast of the Euxine, situated on a promontory of the same name. It was situated 310 stadia southeast of Salmydessus.

Its site is located near Karaburun in European Turkey.

References

Populated places in ancient Thrace
Former populated places in Turkey
History of Istanbul Province